Joy Manikya I (died 1577) was the Maharaja of Tripura from 1573 to 1577.

Life
He was the son of Udai Manikya, who had supplanted Tripura's previous ruling dynasty and adopted its cognomen in 1567. Following his father's death, Joy succeeded him on the throne in 1573. However, his rule was only nominal as the powerful general Ranagan Narayan, who was the husband of his paternal aunt, held actual control of the kingdom, using Joy as a puppet-monarch.

Narayan eventually grew jealous of the popularity enjoyed by Amaradeva, a prince of the former royal family. The latter was invited to a dinner where Narayan planned to have him killed. However, he escaped and, rallying his supporters, captured the regent and had his head cut off. When Joy demanded an explanation for Narayan's death, Amaradeva dispatched his troops against the king, who attempted to flee before being overtaken and also beheaded. Joy's death is believed to have occurred in 1577, having reigned about 4 years. Amaradeva subsequently took power under the name Amar Manikya, thus restoring the throne to the original ruling dynasty.

References

Kings of Tripura
History of Tripura
Dethroned monarchs
1577 deaths
Executed monarchs
Deaths by decapitation